Warren Faidley (born May 11, 1957) is an American storm chaser. Faidley is credited as the world's first full-time, professional storm photographer.

Biography 
Faidley is a graduate from University of Arizona and Pima Community College.

His very first tornado chase landed him in Saragosa, Texas a small community that had been swept away by a violent F4 tornado on May 22, 1987. His professional career was launched in October 1988 after he took a photograph of lightning hitting a light pole in an oil and gasoline tank farm in Tucson, Arizona. The image was published in Life Magazine, billing him as a "Storm Chaser."

In 1997 Faidley was the subject of Stephen Kramer's book Eye of the Storm.

References

Further reading

External links 
  Facebook

Living people
American photojournalists
Storm chasers
Amateur radio people
1957 births
People from Topeka, Kansas